South Side Radio was a U.S. soccer team in St. Louis, Missouri which spent one season, 1937–1938, in the St. Louis Soccer League.

History
South Side Radio, also known as the South Siders, spent most of its existence in the lower St. Louis leagues and divisions.  In 1929, it won the Municipal League, at the time the de facto St. Louis second division, championship.  In 1937, three of the four teams in the St. Louis Soccer League, the city’s top division, dropped out of the league.  South Side, St. Matthew's and St. Patrick's joined the league.  South Side dropped out at the end of the season after finishing third, but not before winning the league cup.

St. Louis Soccer League Record

External links
 St. Louis Soccer League standings

References

Defunct soccer clubs in Missouri
Soccer clubs in St. Louis
St. Louis Soccer League teams